Mount Bolu Tunnel is a  highway tunnel constructed through the Bolu Mountain in Turkey between Kaynaşlı, Düzce and Yumrukaya, Bolu.

Construction
The tunnel is part of the Gümüşova-Gerede Highway O-4 / E80 within the Trans-European Motorway project, which was carried out by the Turkish Bayındır and Italian Astaldi joint venture since April 16, 1993. The total cost of the tunnel is about US$300 million. It has twin  bores carrying three lanes of traffic in each direction.

The tunnel crosses the North Anatolian Fault. The November 12, 1999 Düzce earthquake (MW=7.2) caused substantial damage to the tunnel and viaducts, which were under construction at the time of the earthquake.

On September 4, 2005 the excavation of the tunnel in the Istanbul-Ankara direction was finished. The excavation for the tunnel in the Ankara-Istanbul direction was completed by the beginning of August 2005.

Opening to traffic
The Istanbul-Ankara direction was opened to traffic on January 23, 2007 by the Turkish Prime Minister Recep Tayyip Erdoğan and Italian Prime Minister Romano Prodi. Four months following the initial opening, on May 7, the Ankara-Istanbul direction became operational.

Dangerous goods carriers are not permitted to use the tunnel.

See also
List of motorway tunnels in Turkey

References

External links

 Geotechnical Earthquake Engineering Server – Bolu Viaducts and Tunnel
 Ankara, Turkish Daily News – Mont Blanc sets example for Mt. Bolu Tunnel

Road tunnels in Turkey
Buildings and structures in Düzce Province
Transport in Bolu Province
Tunnels completed in 2007